Ardindrean is a small hamlet, located on the west shore of Loch Broom in Garve, Ross-shire and is within the Highland, Scotland.

Ardindream is in the Scottish council area of Highland.

References

Populated places in Ross and Cromarty